I Curse the River of Time is a 2008 novel by the Norwegian writer Per Petterson. The narrative is set in 1989 against the backdrop of a communist Europe. The story revolves around Arvid Jansen, the protagonist, and his relationship with his mother, who has recently been diagnosed with cancer. The book received the Nordic Council Literature Prize in 2009.

See also
 2008 in literature
 Norwegian literature

References

2008 novels
Norwegian-language novels
21st-century Norwegian novels
Novels by Per Petterson
Fiction set in 1989
Forlaget Oktober books
Nordic Council's Literature Prize-winning works